The GLAAD Media Award for Outstanding Documentary is an annual award that honors documentaries for excellence in the treatment of LGBT (lesbian, gay, bisexual, and transgender) individuals, history, and themes. It is one of several categories of the annual GLAAD Media Awards, which are presented by GLAAD—an American non-governmental media monitoring organization—at ceremonies held primarily in New York City and Los Angeles between March and May.

The award is one of the few to date back to the 1st GLAAD Media Awards in 1990, where it was given to Common Threads: Stories from the Quilt. While no documentary was recognized in 1991 or 1993, the award has been present at every ceremony since the 5th GLAAD Media Awards in 1994. The award has been shared on three occasions; it was given to two documentaries in 1995 and 2014 and three in 1996, when Ballot Measure 9, The Celluloid Closet, and The Question of Equality were all recognized.

For a documentary to be eligible, it must either receive a theatrical release or air on television in more than one local market. Documentaries receiving a theatrical release must be distributed by a recognized film distribution company and play for paid admission for seven consecutive days, while televised ones must air on television within two years of completion. The award is given to the documentary and may be accepted by any of the producers, directors, or individuals featured in the documentary. Documentaries selected by GLAAD are evaluated based on four criteria: "Fair, Accurate, and Inclusive Representations" of the LGBT community, "Boldness and Originality" of the project, significant "Impact" on mainstream culture, and "Overall Quality" of the project. GLAAD monitors mainstream media to identify which films will be nominated, while also issuing a call for entries that encourages media outlets to submit films for consideration. By contrast, in order for films created by and for LGBT audiences to be considered for nomination, they must be submitted after the call for entries. Winners are determined by a plurality vote by GLAAD staff and its board, Shareholders Circle members, volunteers and affiliated individuals.

, the award has been given to 35 documentaries. The only television programs to have been nominated twice are MTV's The Real World and True Life, both of which won once. The Real World won for its third season The Real World: San Francisco in 1995, and True Life for the episode "I'm Gay and I'm Getting Married" in 2005. At the 33rd GLAAD Media Awards in 2022, the award was given to Changing the Game, distributed by Hulu.

Winners and nominees

1990s

2000s

2010s

2020s

Notes

References

Documentary
American documentary film awards